Ek Raja Ek Rani is an Indian television series that aired in 1996 on DD Metro and later on Zee TV. The series is directed by Kushan Nandy, and stars Shekhar Suman and Bhairavi Raichura.

Plot
Ajay Kapoor (Shekhar Suman) is a wealthy millionaire who is in search for the love of his life. His search ended when he meets beautiful Shweta Mehta (Bhairavi Raichura), but first they have clear all the hurdles to be together.  While Shweta's mother (Shubha Khote) and her uncle tries to separate her from Ajay, her father, her cousin and Ajay's best friend Kalidas (Raju Kher) tries everything to help them to be together.

Cast
Shekhar Suman as Ajay Kapoor
Bhairavi Raichura as Shweta Mehta
Raju Kher as Kalidas
Shubha Khote as Shanti
Dinesh Hingoo as Mungerilal
Guddi Maruti
Amrut Patel
Kishore Pradhan
Anoop Kumar as Shopkeeper (Guest Appearance)

Soundtrack
The show has two songs, including the title track, sung by Vinod Rathod. The music is composed by Dinesh Mahavir.

References

DD Metro original programming
Indian drama television series
1996 Indian television series debuts
1996 Indian television series endings